Homelix decussata is a species of beetle in the family Cerambycidae. It was described by Chevrolat in 1856, originally under the genus Pachystola. It is known from Nigeria, the Ivory Coast, Cameroon, and the Republic of the Congo. It feeds on Coffea canephora.

References

Phrynetini
Beetles described in 1856